CMS-02 (also known as GSAT-24) is an Indian Communication Satellite built by ISRO. The CMS-02 satellite is funded, owned and operated by New Space India Limited. Cost of spacecraft was around ₹400 crore. The entire capacity onboard CMS-02 satellite will be leased to Tata Play. The satellite was placed into orbit by using Ariane 5 rocket.

Spacecraft overview 

 Gross lift-off mass: 4181.3 kg
 Dry mass: 1774.9 kg

Payload 

 24 × Broadcasting-satellite service, Ku-band transponders
 1 × Fixed-satellite service, Ku-band transponder
 2 × Ku-band beacons
 2.5 meter diameter Ku-band Transmit/Receive Gregorian antenna
 TT&C in both C-band and Ku-band

Power 

 70V fully regulated bus
 8.5 kW payload power
 12 kW power generation (EOL) using solar panels
 2 × 180Ah Li-Ion battery

Propulsion 

 16 × bipropellant thrusters
 440N Liquid Apogee Motor (LAM) with area ratio of 250
 2 × 1207 litre propellant tank
 2 × 67 litre pressurant tank

Launch 
CMS-02 was launched on 22 June 2022 at 21:50 (UTC) along with MEASAT-3d aboard an Ariane 5 launch vehicle under VA257 campaign.

See also 
 GSAT

References 

GSAT satellites
Spacecraft launched in 2022